Lalit Chandra Bharali College, established in 1971, is a general degree undergraduate, coeducational college situated at Maligaon in Guwahati, Assam. This college is affiliated with the Gauhati University.

Departments

Science
Physics
Mathematics
Electronics and communication technology
Statistics
Computer Science

Arts and Commerce
 Assamese
 Bengali
 English
Hindi
History
Education
Economics
Philosophy
Political Science
Commerce

References

External links
http://lcbcollege.co.in

Universities and colleges in Guwahati
Colleges affiliated to Gauhati University
Educational institutions established in 1971
1971 establishments in Assam